Ormosia nobilis (sometimes incorrectly: Ormosia novilis) is a tree-forming plant species in the genus Ormosia. It grows in tropical South America, primarily in Bolivia, Brazil, Colombia, French Guiana, Guyana, Peru, Paraguay, and Venezuela.  The Ormosis nobilis tree is known as "sirari" and it produces a commercial hardwood which is also known as sirari.

Growth characteristics

Uses
The wood is commercially cut for hardwood floors. The seeds are used in native handicrafts.

Names
The tree and the wood are known by a variety of names including: 
 Amargo blanco, 
 Baracara, 
 Chocho, 
 Jatobahy do igapo, 
 Kokriki, 
 Mekoe, 
 Palo de matos, 
 Peonio, and
 Tento

Varieties
Varieties include:
 Ormosia nobilis Tul. Var. bolivarensis Rudd
 Ormosia nobilis Tul. Var. nobilis
 Ormosia nobilis Tul. Var. santaremnensis (Ducke)Rudd

Notes

Further reading

External links

nobilis
Trees of Peru